Khok Si Suphan is a district (amphoe) of Sakon Nakhon province, northeast Thailand.

History
The minor district (king amphoe) was created on 5 May 1981, when the three tambons Tong Khop, Lao Phon Kho, and Dan Muang Kham were split off from Mueang Sakon Nakhon district. It was upgraded to a full district on 9 May 1992.

Geography
Neighbouring districts are (from the south clockwise) Tao Ngoi, Mueang Sakon Nakhon and Phon Na Kaeo of Sakon Nakhon Province, Wang Yang and Na Kae of Nakhon Phanom province.

Demographics
The people of Khok Si Suphan are predominantly of Phu Thai and Nyaw ethnicity.

Administration
The district is divided into four sub-districts (tambons), which are further subdivided into 52 villages (mubans). There are no municipal (thesaban) areas, and a further four tambon administrative organizations.

References

External links
amphoe.com (Thai)

Khok Si Suphan